The Sackler family has donated to numerous cultural institutions and universities, which named different things after the family. Following public revelations of the Sacklers' involvement in the opioid epidemic, groups such as P.A.I.N. began lobbying for the removal of the Sackler name. As part of the bankruptcy settlement for Purdue Pharma, which was owned by the Sackler family, they allowed institutions to remove their name from scholarships and buildings.

United States

 The American Museum of Natural History contains the Sackler Educational Laboratory and Sackler Institute for Comparative Genetics.
 In 2016, the Dia Art Foundation created the Sackler Institute, but removed the name by in 2019.
 The Solomon R. Guggenheim Museum formerly contained the Sackler Center for Arts Education, removing the family's name in 2022. The museum had previously decided in 2019 that it would no longer accept donations from the Sacklers'; they had donated $9 million from 1995 to 2015.
 The Metropolitan Museum of Art had a Sackler Wing that contained the Temple of Dendur until their name was removed in 2021.
 Tufts University removed the family's name from the Sackler School of Graduate Biomedical Sciences, the Arthur M. Sackler Center for Medical Education, the Sackler Laboratory for the Convergence of Biomedical, Physical and Engineering Sciences, the Sackler Families Fund for Collaborative Cancer Biology Research, and the Richard S. Sackler, M.D. Endowed Research Fund in 2019. Earlier that year, the Massachusetts Attorney General had argued that Purdue Pharma promoted OxyContin using its connections to Tufts.
 Yale University had a Sackler Institute for Biological, Physical and Engineering Sciences and two professorships endowed by the family: the David A. Sackler Professor of Pharmacology and the Richard Sackler and Jonathan Sackler Professorship in Internal Medicine. The university stopped accepting donations from the Sacklers in 2019 and began fully severing ties with the Sacklers in 2021.

United Kingdom 

 The University of Oxford contains the Ashmolean Museum of Art and Archeology's Sackler Keeper of Antiquities.
 The British Museum contains the Raymond and Beverly Sackler Rooms, but announced plans in March 2022 to rename them.
 The City and Guilds of London Art School has a Sackler Library.
 The Dulwich Picture Gallery has a Sackler Director and Sackler Centre for Arts Education.
 Serpentine Sackler Gallery, opened with that name in 2013 in London, changed its name to Serpentine North in 2021. 
 Victoria and Albert Museum's Sackler Courtyard opened in 2017, and changed its name in 2022.

 King's College London contains the London Sackler Institute of Pulmonary Pharmacology and London Sackler Institute for Translational Neurodevelopment.

France 
In July 2019 the Louvre removed the Sackler name from a wing of 12 rooms that contained eastern antiquities. The Louvre issued a statement that the museum had a policy of only naming rooms for 20 years and given that the Sackler donation had been made in 1996 and 1997, the naming period was over. The removal followed a protest led by Nan Goldin at the beginning of the month.

Germany 
Following a donation in 2002, the Jewish Museum Berlin named a staircase after the Sackler family: the Sackler Staircase. In April 2019, the museum announced it would decline any new donations from the family, though it would not rename the staircase nor return the initial donation.

References 

Sackler family
Sackler family